Careless Hands is a studio album by American country music artist Dottie West. It was released in March 1971 on RCA Victor Records and was produced by Jerry Bradley. It was West's seventeenth studio recording issued during her career and contained a collection of ten tracks. The album's only single spawned was the title track.

Background and content
Careless Hands was recorded in December 1970 at RCA Studio B, located in Nashville, Tennessee. The sessions were produced by Jerry Bradley. It was West's third production assignment with Bradley, who produced her two previous releases. The album contained a total of ten tracks. Four of the album's tracks were new recordings. This included the song, "Yonder Comes a Train", which was written by Red Lane. West and Lane had co-composed several songs since the late 1960s. The album's six remaining tracks were cover versions of songs previously recorded by other artists. One of these songs included a cover of Sammi Smith's "Help Me Make It Through the Night". After it was first composed, its writer (Kris Kristofferson) had first offered the song to West. However, she turned it down, finding the song to be too sexually explicit. After the song became a hit however, West decided to record it for the album. Other covers included Lynn Anderson's "(I Never Promised You a) Rose Garden", Anne Murray's "Snowbird" and Hank Williams' "I'm So Lonesome I Could Cry".

Release and reception
Careless Hands was released in March 1971 on RCA Victor Records, becoming West's seventeenth studio album issued. It was first issued as a vinyl LP, consisting of five songs on each side of the record. Careless Hands did not reach any Billboard album surveys upon its release. It did spawn one single. The title track was issued as a single in January 1971. It became a minor hit in April 1971, only reaching number 48 on the Billboard Hot Country Singles chart. Careless Hands was reviewed favorably by Billboard magazine in March 1971. Writers notably praised the album's collection of covers. "Miss West is riding the singles chart with her smooth revival of the oldie 'Careless Hands', and that hit proves the basis for this fine album follow-up," writers commented.

Track listing

Personnel
All credits are adapted from the liner notes of Careless Hands.

Musical personnel
 Harold Bradley – guitar
 Pete Drake – steel guitar
 Ray Edenton – guitar
 Buddy Harman – drums
 The Jordanaires – background vocals
 Grady Martin – guitar
 Charlie McCoy – harmonica, vibes
 Hargus "Pig" Robbins – piano
 Bill West – steel guitar
 Dottie West – lead vocals
 Joe Zinkan – bass

Technical personnel
 Jerry Bradley – producer
 Ray Butts – recording technician
 Bill Grine – photography 
 Tom Pick – engineering
 Roy Shockley – recording technician
 Bill Vandevort – engineering

Release history

References

1971 albums
Albums produced by Jerry Bradley (music executive)
Dottie West albums
RCA Records albums